Frank Lynn Jenkins (14 April 1870 – 1 September 1927) was a British sculptor.

He was born in Torquay, Devon, the son of Henry Tozer Jenkins, a stonemason, quarry owner and marble merchant.

References

External links

1870 births
1927 deaths
British sculptors
Artists from Torquay